The 1985 Philadelphia Eagles season was their 53rd in the National Football League (NFL). The team improved upon their previous output of 6–9–1, winning seven games. This was the fourth consecutive season in which the team failed to qualify for the playoffs.

Philadelphia was in position to earn a wild-card berth with a 6–5 record by late November, but a four-game losing streak, which included a home loss to the Minnesota Vikings in which the Eagles squandered a 23–0 fourth-quarter lead, foiled their playoff hopes. That losing streak also cost head coach Marion Campbell his job before the season finale at Minnesota. Under interim coach Fred Bruney, the Eagles pulled off a 37–35 victory at the Metrodome to finish the season on an up note.

Two bright spots emerged at the quarterback position as Ron Jaworski returned from the broken leg suffered at the end of the 1984 season, and performed well enough (3,450 passing yards, 17 touchdowns) to be considered for comeback player of the year, though no award was given out. In addition, second-round draft pick Randall Cunningham earned his first career victory at RFK Stadium on September 22 at Washington. On November 10, at Veterans Stadium, Jaworski combined with wide receiver Mike Quick for a club-record 99-yard touchdown pass in overtime to beat the Atlanta Falcons, 23–17.

Offseason

NFL draft

Personnel

Staff

Roster

Schedule

Note: Intra-division opponents are in bold text.

Game summaries

Week 10

Standings

Awards and honors
 Mike Quick, 1985 Pro Bowl selection
 Mike Quick, Associated Press first-team All-Pro selection 1985

References

External links
 1985 Philadelphia Eagles at Pro-Football-Reference.com

Philadelphia Eagles seasons
Philadelphia Eagles
Philadelphia Eagles